The 2008–09 Vancouver Canucks season was the 39th season in the National Hockey League.

Season events

Off-season

On June 17, 2008, the Canucks named Ryan Walter as an assistant coach. He joined head coach Alain Vigneault and assistant coach Rick Bowness on the Canucks' coaching staff. Walter, 50, played in 1,003 NHL games over 15 seasons with Washington, Montreal, and Vancouver, scoring 264 goals and 382 assists. He won the Stanley Cup with Montreal in 1986. A native of New Westminster, British Columbia, Walter was the second overall pick by the Washington Capitals in the 1978 NHL Amateur Draft.

The Canucks lost two key veterans to free agency. Markus Naslund, the Canucks' captain for the previous seven seasons, signed a two-year, $8 million contract with the New York Rangers, while Pitt Meadows native Brendan Morrison signed a one-year, $2.75 million contract with the Anaheim Ducks.

The Canucks also lost a promising young defenceman in Luc Bourdon, who died in a motorcycle accident in his hometown of Shippagan, New Brunswick. The Canucks honoured Bourdon with a tribute in the season opener, October 9, against the Calgary Flames.

Among the Canucks' roster additions was Steve Bernier, who was acquired from the Buffalo Sabres for a second- and third-round draft pick, and Pavol Demitra, who signed a two-year, $8 million contract.

The Canucks announced on September 4, 2008, that they will honour Linden in a pre-game ceremony on December 17, 2008 before a game against the Edmonton Oilers. His jersey number, 16, will be retired by the team, joining former captain Stan Smyl as the second Canuck to have his number retired.

Pre-season
The Canucks' 2008 pre-season began on September 12 with the opening of their annual prospects training camp. The camp consisted of 22 players and was held in Vancouver, British Columbia at both General Motors Place and the University of British Columbia campus, as well as in Camrose, Alberta. The prospect camp was then followed by the main training camp, held over two days beginning September 20 in Whistler, British Columbia.

On September 30, 2008, the Canucks named Roberto Luongo as the twelfth captain in team history, with Luongo becoming only the seventh goaltender in NHL history to be named team captain. NHL rules prevent goaltenders from physically wearing the captain's letter "C", however, they do not prevent goaltenders from being named captain.  The Canucks also named Willie Mitchell, Mattias Ohlund, and Ryan Kesler as alternate captains. Mitchell assumed the duties of dealing with officials during games, while Ohlund took faceoffs and performed other ceremonial duties.

Standings

Divisional standings

Conference standings

Schedule and results

Regular season

Playoffs

Player statistics

Skaters

Note: GP = Games played; G = Goals; A = Assists; Pts = Points; +/- = Plus/Minus; PIM = Penalty Minutes

Goaltenders

†Denotes player spent time with another team before joining Vancouver. Stats reflect time with the Canucks only. ‡Denotes player no longer with the team. Stats reflect time with Canucks only.

Awards and records

Awards
 Daniel Sedin was named the NHL's first star of the week for the week ending October 12, 2008.
 Roberto Luongo was named the NHL's first star of the week for the week ending November 9, 2008.
 Henrik Sedin was named the NHL's second star of the week for the week ending November 23, 2008.
 Roberto Luongo was named to the Western Conference roster for the 57th National Hockey League All-Star Game in Montreal.
 Daniel Sedin was named the NHL's second star of the week for the week ending March 29, 2009.
 Henrik Sedin was named the NHL's second star of the month for March.
 Roberto Luongo was named the NHL's first star of the week for the week ending April 12, 2009.

Records
 Roberto Luongo set a franchise record for consecutive shutout minutes with 242:36 on November 12, 2008 versus the Colorado Avalanche.
 The Canucks set a franchise record for consecutive home losses with 7 on January 18, 2009 versus the Columbus Blue Jackets.
 Mattias Ohlund set a franchise record for the most points scored by a defenceman with 322 points on March 15, 2009 versus the Colorado Avalanche.
 The Canucks set a franchise record for consecutive home wins with 11 on March 19, 2009 versus the St. Louis Blues.
 Roberto Luongo set a franchise record for most shutouts in a season with 8 on April 9, 2009 versus the Los Angeles Kings, and ended the season with one more, for a total of 9 shutouts and tying Kirk McLean for the all-time franchise lead in shutouts.

Milestones

Transactions

Trades

Free agents acquiredFree agents lost

Received from waiversLost on waivers

Draft picks
Vancouver's picks at the 2008 NHL Entry Draft in Ottawa, Ontario.

7th Canuck
On October 25, 2008, the Canucks retired the jersey number '7' in honour of the fans, the "seventh Canuck". Originally, the plan was to have a randomly selected season ticket holder unveil the banner before every home game and have it raised to the rafters, but after the first game it was abandoned.

Farm teams

Manitoba Moose
The Canucks' AHL affiliate based in Winnipeg, Manitoba.  The Moose' home arena is the MTS Centre. The team has been affiliated with the Vancouver Canucks since the 2000–01 AHL season.

Victoria Salmon Kings
The Canucks' ECHL affiliate based in Victoria, British Columbia.  The Salmon Kings' home arena is the Save-On-Foods Memorial Centre. The team has been affiliated with the Vancouver Canucks since the 2006–07 ECHL season.

References

External links
 Vancouver Canucks official website

Vancouver Canucks seasons
Vancouver Canucks season, 2008-09
Vancouver